Alicia Martin (born in Asunción) is a Paraguayan former model, actress and singer.

Martin began her career as a model and started appearing in television shows such as Extra Fashion, Paraguay Extremo and El Tajo. In 2008 she won the role of Andrea in the telenovela Papá del corazón with Paola Maltese. In 2009 she played Elba in  De mil amores.  In 2008, Alicia appeared in the film El Regalo de Sofia and in Semana Capital in 2010.

References

Paraguayan female models
Paraguayan television actresses
Paraguayan telenovela actresses
People from Asunción
Living people
Year of birth missing (living people)
21st-century Paraguayan actresses